"Cover Girl" is a 1989 single from New Kids on the Block. The lead vocals were sung by Donnie Wahlberg. The fifth and final single from their multi-platinum second studio album Hangin' Tough (1988), it peaked at number two on the Billboard Hot 100 on the week of November 4, being held off from the top spot by Roxette's "Listen to Your Heart".

Some of the UK releases of "Cover Girl" released in 1990 included the 7" and 12" remix by Pete Hammond for Pete Waterman Entertainment. The 7" remix was included as a bonus track on the 30th anniversary of "Hangin' Tough".

This song and "Tonight" were covered by South Korean singer Lee Min Woo of boy band Shinhwa in his concert on 14 and 15 January 2006 in Seoul.

Track listing and formats
UK Promo single
 Cover Girl - 4:02
 Cover Girl (12" Remix) - 6:54
 Stop It Girl - 3:43
 I Need You - 3:36

UK 7-inch vinyl single
A Cover Girl - 4:02
B Stop It Girl - 3:43

UK 12-inch vinyl single
A  Cover Girl (12" Remix) - 6:54
B1 Stop It Girl - 3:43
B2 I Need You - 3:36

US single
A1 Cover Girl
A2 Merry, Merry Christmas
B1 Cover Girl
B2 Merry, Merry Christmas

US 7-inch vinyl single
A Cover Girl
B Merry, Merry Christmas

US 12-inch vinyl single
A  Cover Girl (12" Remix) - 6:54
B1 I Remember When - 4:09
B2 Cover Girl (Album Version) - 4:02

Charts

Weekly charts

Year-end charts

Certifications and sales

References

External links

1989 singles
New Kids on the Block songs
Columbia Records singles
Songs written by Maurice Starr
Song recordings produced by Maurice Starr
1988 songs